Acromycter perturbator is an eel in the family Congridae (conger/garden eels). It was described by Albert Eide Parr in 1932, originally under the genus Ariosoma. It is a marine, deep water-dwelling eel which is known from the northwestern and western central Atlantic Ocean, including the Bahamas, the United States, and Jamaica. It dwells at a depth range of 1299–1318 metres.

Due to its wide distribution, lack of perceived threats, and estimated population stability, the IUCN redlist currently lists Acromycter perturbator as Least Concern.

References

Congridae
Fish described in 1932